Jeannot Schaul (born 22 October 1948) is a retired Luxembourgian football defender.

References

1948 births
Living people
Luxembourgian footballers
Jeunesse Esch players
Association football defenders
Luxembourg international footballers